Leonid Vladimirovich Bartenyev (10 October 1933 – 17 November 2021) was a Soviet athlete who competed mainly in the 100 metres. Bartenyev was born in Poltava in October 1933. He trained at Burevestnik in Kiev.  He competed for the USSR in the 1956 Summer Olympics held in Melbourne in the 4 x 100 metre relay where he won the silver medal with his teammates Boris Tokarev, Yuriy Konovalov, and Vladimir Sukharev.  He teamed up with Yuriy Konovalov again four years later in the 1960 Summer Olympics held in Rome in the 4 x 100 metre relay where they won their second silver medals with new teammates Gusman Kosanov and Edvin Ozolin.

References

External links
 

1933 births
2021 deaths
Ukrainian male sprinters
Soviet male sprinters
Olympic silver medalists for the Soviet Union
Athletes (track and field) at the 1956 Summer Olympics
Athletes (track and field) at the 1960 Summer Olympics
Olympic athletes of the Soviet Union
Burevestnik (sports society) athletes
European Athletics Championships medalists
Sportspeople from Poltava
Medalists at the 1960 Summer Olympics
Medalists at the 1956 Summer Olympics
Olympic silver medalists in athletics (track and field)
Universiade medalists in athletics (track and field)
Universiade gold medalists for the Soviet Union
Medalists at the 1961 Summer Universiade
Deaths from the COVID-19 pandemic in Russia